The 1977/78 NTFL season was the 57th season of the Northern Territory Football League (NTFL).

St Marys have won their ninth premiership title while defeating the Nth. Darwin (Palmerston) Magpies in the grand final by 23 points.

Grand Final

References

Northern Territory Football League seasons
NTFL